Equatorial Guinea, officially the Republic of Equatorial Guinea, is a country on the west coast of Central Africa, with an area of . Formerly the colony of Spanish Guinea, its post-independence name evokes its location near both the Equator and the Gulf of Guinea. , the country had a population of 1,468,777.

Equatorial Guinea consists of two parts, an insular and a mainland region. The insular region consists of the islands of Bioko (formerly Fernando Pó) in the Gulf of Guinea and Annobón, a small volcanic island which is the only part of the country south of the equator. Bioko Island is the northernmost part of Equatorial Guinea and is the site of the country's capital, Malabo. The Portuguese-speaking island nation of São Tomé and Príncipe is located between Bioko and Annobón. The mainland region, Río Muni, is bordered by Cameroon on the north and Gabon on the south and east. It is the location of Bata, Equatorial Guinea's largest city, and Ciudad de la Paz, the country's planned future capital. Rio Muni also includes several small offshore islands, such as Corisco, Elobey Grande, and Elobey Chico. The country is a member of the African Union, Francophonie, OPEC and the CPLP.

After becoming independent from Spain in 1968, Equatorial Guinea was ruled by President for life Francisco Macías Nguema until he was overthrown in a coup in 1979 by his nephew Teodoro Obiang Nguema Mbasogo who has served as the country's president since. Both presidents have been widely characterized as dictators by foreign observers. Since the mid-1990s, Equatorial Guinea has become one of sub-Saharan Africa's largest oil producers. It has subsequently become the richest country per capita in Africa, and its gross domestic product (GDP) adjusted for purchasing power parity (PPP) per capita ranks 43rd in the world; however, the wealth is distributed extremely unevenly, with few people benefiting from the oil riches. The country ranks 144th on the 2019 Human Development Index, with less than half the population having access to clean drinking water and 7.9% of children dying before the age of five.

As a former Spanish colony, the country maintains Spanish as its official language alongside French and recently (as of 2010) Portuguese, being the only African country (aside from the largely unrecognized Sahrawi Arab Democratic Republic) where Spanish is an official language. It is also the most widely spoken language (considerably more than the other two official languages); according to the Instituto Cervantes, 87.7% of the population has a good command of Spanish. The Fang people are the country's dominant ethnic group, comprising more than 85% of the population. The Bubi people, indigenous to Bioko are the second largest group at approximately 6.5% of the population.

Equatorial Guinea's government is authoritarian and has one of the worst human rights records in the world, consistently ranking among the "worst of the worst" in Freedom House's annual survey of political and civil rights. Reporters Without Borders ranks Obiang among its "predators" of press freedom. Human trafficking is a significant problem, with the U.S. Trafficking in Persons Report identifying Equatorial Guinea as a source and destination country for forced labour and sex trafficking. The report also noted that Equatorial Guinea "does not fully meet the minimum standards for the elimination of trafficking but is making significant efforts to do so."

History 

Pygmies probably once lived in the continental region that is now Equatorial Guinea, but are today found only in isolated pockets in southern Río Muni. Bantu migrations started probably around 2,000 BC from between south-east Nigeria and north-west Cameroon (the Grassfields). They must have settled continental Equatorial Guinea around 500 BC at the latest. The earliest settlements on Bioko Island are dated to AD 530. The Annobón population, originally native to Angola, was introduced by the Portuguese via São Tomé island.

First European contact and Portuguese rule (1472–1778) 

The Portuguese explorer Fernando Pó, seeking a path to India, is credited as being the first European to see the island of Bioko, in 1472. He called it Formosa ("Beautiful"), but it quickly took on the name of its European discoverer. Fernando Pó and Annobón were colonized by Portugal in 1474. The first factories were established on the islands around 1500 as the Portuguese quickly recognized the positives of the islands including volcanic soil and disease-resistant highlands. Despite natural advantages, initial Portuguese efforts in 1507 to establish a sugarcane plantation and town near what is now Concepción on Fernando Pó failed due to Bubi hostility and fever. The main island's rainy climate, extreme humidity and temperature swings took a major toll on European settlers from the beginning, and it would be centuries before attempts restarted.

Early Spanish rule and lease to Britain (1778–1844) 
In 1778, Queen Maria I of Portugal and King Charles III of Spain signed the Treaty of El Pardo which ceded Bioko, adjacent islets, and commercial rights to the Bight of Biafra between the Niger and Ogoue rivers to Spain in exchange for large areas in South America that are now Western Brazil. Brigadier Felipe José, Count of Arjelejos sailed from Uruguay to formally take possession of Bioko from Portugal, landing on the island on 21 October 1778. After sailing for Annobón to take possession, the Count died of disease caught on Bioko and the fever-ridden crew mutinied. The crew landed on São Tomé instead where they were imprisoned by the Portuguese authorities after having lost over 80% of their men to sickness. As a result of this disaster, Spain was thereafter hesitant to invest heavily in its new possession. However, despite the setback Spaniards began to use the island as a base for slave trading on the nearby mainland. Between 1778 and 1810, the territory of what became Equatorial Guinea was administered by the Viceroyalty of the Río de la Plata, based in Buenos Aires.

Unwilling to invest heavily in the development of Fernando Pó, from 1827 to 1843, the Spanish leased a base at Malabo on Bioko to the United Kingdom which had sought as part of its efforts to suppress the transatlantic slave trade. Without Spanish permission, the British moved the headquarters of the Mixed Commission for the Suppression of Slave Traffic to Fernando Pó in 1827, before moving it back to Sierra Leone under an agreement with Spain in 1843. Spain's decision to abolish slavery in 1817 at British insistence damaged the colony's perceived value to the authorities and so leasing naval bases was an effective revenue earner from an otherwise unprofitable possession. An agreement by Spain to sell its African colony to the British was cancelled in 1841 due to metropolitan public opinion and opposition by Spanish Congress.

Late 19th century (1844–1900) 

In 1844, the British returned the island to Spanish control and the area became known as the "Territorios Españoles del Golfo de Guinea". Due to epidemics, Spain did not invest much in the colony, and in 1862 an outbreak of yellow fever killed many of the whites that had settled on the island. Despite this, plantations continued to be established by private citizens through the second half of the 19th century.

The plantations of Fernando Pó were mostly run by a black Creole elite, later known as Fernandinos. The British settled some 2,000 Sierra Leoneans and freed slaves there during their rule, and a trickle of immigration from West Africa and the West Indies continued after the British left. A number of freed Angolan slaves, Portuguese-African creoles and immigrants from Nigeria and Liberia also began to be settled in the colony where they quickly began to join the new group. To the local mix were added Cubans, Filipinos, Jews and Spaniards of various colours, many of whom had been deported to Africa for political or other crimes, as well as some settlers backed by the government.

By 1870 the prognosis of whites that lived on the island was much improved after recommendations that they live in the highlands, and by 1884 much of the minimal administrative machinery and key plantations had moved to Basile hundreds of meters above sea level. Henry Morton Stanley had labeled Fernando Pó "a jewel which Spain did not polish" for refusing to enact such a policy. Despite the improved survival chances of Europeans living on the island, Mary Kingsley, who was staying on the island still described Fernando Pó as 'a more uncomfortable form of execution' for Spaniards appointed there.

There was also a trickle of immigration from the neighboring Portuguese islands, escaped slaves, and prospective planters. Although a few of the Fernandinos were Catholic and Spanish-speaking, about nine-tenths of them were Protestant and English-speaking on the eve of the First World War, and pidgin English was the lingua franca of the island. The Sierra Leoneans were particularly well placed as planters while labor recruitment on the Windward coast continued, for they kept family and other connections there and could easily arrange a supply of labor. The Fernandinos proved to become effective traders and middlemen between the natives and Europeans. A freed slave from the West Indies by way of Sierra Leone named William Pratt established the cocoa crop on Fernando Pó.

Early 20th century (1900–1945) 

Spain had not occupied the large area in the Bight of Biafra to which it had right by treaty, and the French had busily expanded their occupation at the expense of the territory claimed by Spain. Madrid only partly backed the explorations of men like Manuel Iradier who had signed treaties in the interior as far as Gabon and Cameroon, leaving much of the land out of 'effective occupation' as demanded by the terms of the 1885 Berlin Conference. More important events such as the conflict in Cuba and the eventual Spanish–American War kept Madrid busy at an inopportune moment. Minimal government backing for mainland annexation came as a result of public opinion and a need for labour on Fernando Pó.

The eventual treaty of Paris in 1900 left Spain with the continental enclave of Rio Muni, a mere 26,000 km out of the 300,000 stretching east to the Ubangi river which the Spaniards had initially claimed. The tiny enclave was far smaller than what the Spaniards had considered themselves rightfully entitled to under their claims and the Treaty of El Pardo. The humiliation of the Franco-Spanish negotiations, combined with the disaster in Cuba led to the head of the Spanish negotiating team, Pedro Gover y Tovar committing suicide on the voyage home on 21 October 1901. Iradier himself died in despair in 1911, and it would be decades before his achievements would be recognised by Spanish popular opinion when the port of Cogo was renamed Puerto Iradier in his honour.

The opening years of the twentieth century saw a new generation of Spanish immigrants. Land regulations issued in 1904–1905 favoured Spaniards, and most of the later big planters arrived from Spain after that. An agreement made with Liberia in 1914 to import cheap labor greatly favoured wealthy men with ready access to the state, and the shift in labor supplies from Liberia to Río Muni increased this advantage. Due to malpractice however, the Liberian government eventually ended the treaty after embarrassing revelations about the state of Liberian workers on Fernando Pó in the Christy Report which brought down the country's president Charles D. B. King in 1930.

The greatest constraint to economic development was a chronic shortage of labour. Pushed into the interior of the island and decimated by alcohol addiction, venereal disease, smallpox, and sleeping sickness, the indigenous Bubi population of Bioko refused to work on plantations. Working their own small cocoa farms gave them a considerable degree of autonomy.

By the late nineteenth century, the Bubi were protected from the demands of the planters by Spanish Claretian missionaries, who were very influential in the colony and eventually organised the Bubi into little mission theocracies reminiscent of the famous Jesuit reductions in Paraguay. Catholic penetration was furthered by two small insurrections in 1898 and 1910 protesting conscription of forced labour for the plantations. The Bubi were disarmed in 1917, and left dependent on the missionaries. Serious labour shortages were temporarily solved by a massive influx of refugees from German Kamerun, along with thousands of white German soldiers who stayed on the island for several years.

Between 1926 and 1959 Bioko and Rio Muni were united as the colony of Spanish Guinea. The economy was based on large cacao and coffee plantations and logging concessions and the workforce was mostly immigrant contract labour from Liberia, Nigeria, and Cameroun. Between 1914 and 1930, an estimated 10,000 Liberians went to Fernando Po under a labour treaty that was stopped altogether in 1930.

With Liberian workers no longer available, planters of Fernando Po turned to Rio Muni. Campaigns were mounted to subdue the Fang people in the 1920s, at the time that Liberia was beginning to cut back on recruitment. There were garrisons of the colonial guard throughout the enclave by 1926, and the whole colony was considered 'pacified' by 1929.

The Spanish Civil War had a major impact on the colony. 150 Spanish whites, including the Governor-General and Vice-Governor-General of Río Muni created a socialist party called the Popular Front in the enclave which served to oppose the interests of the Fernando Pó plantation owners. When the War broke out Francisco Franco ordered Nationalist forces based in the Canaries to ensure control over Equatorial Guinea. In September 1936 Nationalist forces backed by Falangists from Fernando Pó, similarly to what happened in Spain proper took control of Río Muni, which under Governor-General Luiz Sanchez Guerra Saez and his deputy Porcel had backed the Republican government. By November the Popular Front and its supporters had been defeated and Equatorial Guinea secured for Franco. The commander in charge of the occupation, Juan Fontán Lobé was appointed Governor-General by Franco and began to exert more effective Spanish control over the enclave interior.

Rio Muni had a small population, officially a little over 100,000 in the 1930s, and escape across the frontiers into Cameroun or Gabon was very easy. Also, the timber companies needed increasing numbers of workers, and the spread of coffee cultivation offered an alternative means of paying taxes. Fernando Pó thus continued to suffer from labour shortages. The French only briefly permitted recruitment in Cameroun, and the main source of labour came to be Igbo smuggled in canoes from Calabar in Nigeria. This resolution to the worker shortage allowed Fernando Pó to become one of Africa's most productive agricultural areas after the Second World War.

Final years of Spanish rule (1945–1968) 

Politically, post-war colonial history has three fairly distinct phases: up to 1959, when its status was raised from 'colonial' to 'provincial', following the approach of the Portuguese Empire; between 1960 and 1968, when Madrid attempted a partial decolonisation aimed at keeping the territory as part of the Spanish system; and from 1968 on, after the territory became an independent republic. The first phase consisted of little more than a continuation of previous policies; these closely resembled the policies of Portugal and France, notably in dividing the population into a vast majority governed as 'natives' or non-citizens, and a very small minority (together with whites) admitted to civic status as emancipados, assimilation to the metropolitan culture being the only permissible means of advancement.

This 'provincial' phase saw the beginnings of nationalism, but chiefly among small groups who had taken refuge from the Caudillos paternal hand in Cameroun and Gabon. They formed two bodies: the Movimiento Nacional de Liberación de la Guinea (MONALIGE), and the Idea Popular de Guinea Ecuatorial (IPGE). The pressure they could bring to bear was weak, but the general trend in West Africa was not, and by the late 1960s much of the African continent had been granted independence. Aware of this trend, the Spanish began to increase efforts to prepare the country for independence and massively stepped up development. The Gross National Product per capita in 1965 was $466 which was the highest in black Africa, and the Spanish constructed an international airport at Santa Isabel, a television station and increased the literacy rate to a relatively high 89%. At the same time measures were taken to battle sleeping sickness and leprosy in the enclave, and by 1967 the number of hospital beds per capita in Equatorial Guinea was higher than Spain itself, with 1637 beds in 16 hospitals. All the same, measures to improve education floundered and like in the Democratic Republic of Congo by the end of colonial rule the number of Africans in higher education was in only the double digits, and political education necessary to a functioning state was negligible.

This proved a feeble instrument, and, with growing pressure for change from the UN, Madrid was gradually forced to give way to the currents of nationalism. Two General Assembly resolutions were passed in 1965 ordering Spain to grant independence to the colony, and in 1966 a UN Commission toured the country before recommending the same thing. In response, the Spanish declared that they would hold a constitutional convention on 27 October 1967 to negotiate a new constitution for an independent Equatorial Guinea. The conference was attended by 41 local delegates and 25 Spaniards. The Africans were principally divided between Fernandinos and Bubi on one side, who feared a loss of privileges and 'swamping' by the Fang majority, and the Río Muni Fang nationalists on the other. At the conference the leading Fang figure, the later first president Francisco Macías Nguema gave a controversial speech in which he claimed that Adolf Hitler had 'saved Africa'. After nine sessions the conference was suspended due to deadlock between the 'unionists' and 'separatists' who wanted a separate Fernando Pó. Macías resolved to travel to the UN to bolster international awareness of the issue, and his firebrand speeches in New York contributed to Spain naming a date for both independence and general elections. In July 1968 virtually all Bubi leaders went to the UN in New York to try and raise awareness for their cause, but the world community was uninterested in quibbling over the specifics of colonial independence. The 1960s were a time of great optimism over the future of the former African colonies, and groups that had been close to European rulers, like the Bubi, were not viewed positively.

Independence under Macías (1968–1979) 

Independence from Spain was gained on 12 October 1968, at noon in the capital, Malabo. The new country became the Republic of Equatorial Guinea (the date is celebrated as the country's Independence Day). Macías became president in the country's only free and fair election. The Spanish (ruled by Franco) had backed Macías in the election due to his perceived loyalty, however while on the campaign trail he had proven to be far less easy to handle than they had expected. Much of his campaigning involved visiting rural areas of Río Muni and promising young Fang that they would have the houses and wives of the Spanish if they voted for him. In the towns he had instead presented himself as the urbane leader who had bested the Spanish at the UN, and he had won in the second round of voting; greatly helped by the vote-splitting of his rivals.

The euphoria of independence became quickly overshadowed by problems emanating from the Nigerian Civil War. Fernando Pó was inhabited by many Biafra-supporting Ibo migrant workers and many refugees from the breakaway state fled to the island, straining it to breaking point. The International Committee of the Red Cross began running relief flights out of Equatorial Guinea, but Macías quickly became spooked and shut the flights down, refusing to allow them to fly diesel fuel for their trucks nor oxygen tanks for medical operations. Very quickly the Biafran separatists were starved into submission without international backing.

After the Public Prosecutor complained about "excesses and maltreatment" by government officials, Macías had 150 alleged coup-plotters executed in a purge on Christmas Eve 1969, all of whom happened to be political opponents. Macias Nguema further consolidated his totalitarian powers by outlawing opposition political parties in July 1970 and making himself president for life in 1972. He broke off ties with Spain and the West. In spite of his condemnation of Marxism, which he deemed "neo-colonialist", Equatorial Guinea maintained very special relations with communist states, notably China, Cuba, East Germany and the USSR. Macias Nguema signed a preferential trade agreement and a shipping treaty with the Soviet Union. The Soviets also made loans to Equatorial Guinea.

The shipping agreement gave the Soviets permission for a pilot fishery development project and also a naval base at Luba. In return the USSR was to supply fish to Equatorial Guinea. China and Cuba also gave different forms of financial, military, and technical assistance to Equatorial Guinea, which got them a measure of influence there. For the USSR, there was an advantage to be gained in the War in Angola from access to Luba base and later on to Malabo International Airport.

In 1974, the World Council of Churches affirmed that large numbers of people had been murdered since 1968 in an ongoing reign of terror. A quarter of the entire population had fled abroad, they said, while 'the prisons are overflowing and to all intents and purposes form one vast concentration camp'. Out of a population of 300,000, an estimated 80,000 were killed. Apart from allegedly committing genocide against the ethnic minority Bubi people, Macias Nguema ordered the deaths of thousands of suspected opponents, closed down churches and presided over the economy's collapse as skilled citizens and foreigners fled the country.

Obiang (1979–present) 

The nephew of Macías Nguema, Teodoro Obiang deposed his uncle on 3 August 1979, in a bloody coup d'état; over two weeks of civil war ensued until Macías Nguema was captured. He was tried and executed soon afterward, with Obiang succeeding him as a less bloody, but still authoritarian president.

In 1995 Mobil, an American oil company, discovered oil in Equatorial Guinea. The country subsequently experienced rapid economic development, but earnings from the country's oil wealth have not reached the population and the country ranks low on the UN human development index. 7.9% of children die before the age of 5 and more than 50% of the population lacks access to clean drinking water. President Teodoro Obiang is widely suspected of using the country's oil wealth to enrich himself and his associates. In 2006, Forbes estimated his personal wealth at $600 million.

In 2011, the government announced it was planning a new capital for the country, named Oyala. The city was renamed Ciudad de la Paz ("City of Peace") in 2017.

, Obiang is Africa's second-longest serving dictator after Cameroon's Paul Biya.

Equatorial Guinea was elected as a non-permanent member of the United Nations Security Council 2018–19.

On 7 March 2021, there were munition explosions at a military base near the city of Bata causing 98 deaths and 600 people being injured and treated at the hospital.

In November 2022 Obiang was re-elected in the 2022 Equatorial Guinean general election with 99.7% of the vote amid accusations of fraud by the opposition.

Government and politics 

The current president of Equatorial Guinea is Teodoro Obiang. The 1982 constitution of Equatorial Guinea gives him extensive powers, including naming and dismissing members of the cabinet, making laws by decree, dissolving the Chamber of Representatives, negotiating and ratifying treaties and serving as commander in chief of the armed forces. Prime Minister Francisco Pascual Obama Asue was appointed by Obiang and operates under powers delegated by the President.

During the four decades of his rule, Obiang has shown little tolerance for opposition. While the country is nominally a multiparty democracy, its elections have generally been considered a sham. According to Human Rights Watch, the dictatorship of President Obiang used an oil boom to entrench and enrich itself further at the expense of the country's people. Since August 1979 some 12 real and perceived unsuccessful coup attempts have occurred.

According to a March 2004 BBC profile, politics within the country were dominated by tensions between Obiang's son, Teodoro Nguema Obiang Mangue, and other close relatives with powerful positions in the security forces. The tension may be rooted in a power shift arising from the dramatic increase in oil production which has occurred since 1997.

In 2004 a plane load of suspected mercenaries was intercepted in Zimbabwe while allegedly on the way to overthrow Obiang. A November 2004 report named Mark Thatcher as a financial backer of the 2004 Equatorial Guinea coup d'état attempt organized by Simon Mann. Various accounts also named the United Kingdom's MI6, the United States' CIA, and Spain as tacit supporters of the coup attempt. Nevertheless, the Amnesty International report released in June 2005
on the ensuing trial of those allegedly involved highlighted the prosecution's failure to produce conclusive evidence that a coup attempt had actually taken place. Simon Mann was released from prison on 3 November 2009 for humanitarian reasons.

Since 2005, Military Professional Resources Inc., a US-based international private military company, has worked in Equatorial Guinea to train police forces in appropriate human rights practices. In 2006, US Secretary of State Condoleezza Rice hailed Obiang as a "good friend" despite repeated criticism of his human rights and civil liberties record. The US Agency for International Development entered into a memorandum of understanding (MOU) with Obiang, in April 2006, to establish a social development Fund in the country, implementing projects in the areas of health, education, women's affairs and the environment.

In 2006, Obiang signed an anti-torture decree banning all forms of abuse and improper treatment in Equatorial Guinea, and commissioned the renovation and modernization of Black Beach prison in 2007 to ensure the humane treatment of prisoners. However, human rights abuses have continued. Human Rights Watch and Amnesty International among other non-governmental organizations have documented severe human rights abuses in prisons, including torture, beatings, unexplained deaths and illegal detention.

In their most recently publishing findings (2020), Transparency International awarded Equatorial Guinea a total score of 16 on their Corruption Perceptions Index (CPI). CPI ranks countries by their perceived level of public corruption where zero is very corrupt and 100 is extremely clean. Equatorial Guinea was the 174th lowest scoring nation out of a total of 180 countries. Freedom House, a pro-democracy and human rights NGO, described Obiang as one of the world's "most kleptocratic living autocrats", and complained about the US government welcoming his administration and buying oil from it.

Obiang was re-elected to serve an additional term in 2009 in an election the African Union deemed "in line with electoral law". Obiang re-appointed Prime Minister Ignacio Milam Tang in 2010.

In November 2011, a new constitution was approved. The vote on the constitution was taken though neither the text or its content was revealed to the public before the vote. Under the new constitution the president was limited to a maximum of two seven-year terms and would be both the head of state and head of the government, therefore eliminating the prime minister. The new constitution also introduced the figure of a vice president and called for the creation of a 70-member senate with 55 senators elected by the people and the 15 remaining designated by the president. Surprisingly, in the following cabinet reshuffle it was announced that there would be two vice-presidents in clear violation of the constitution that was just taking effect.

In October 2012, during an interview with Christiane Amanpour on CNN, Obiang was asked whether he would step down at the end of the current term (2009–2016) since the new constitution limited the number of terms to two and he has been reelected at least 4 times. Obiang answered he refused to step aside because the new constitution was not retroactive and the two-term limit would only become applicable from 2016.

The elections on 26 May 2013 combined the senate, lower house and mayoral contests all in a single package. Like all previous elections, this was denounced by the opposition and it too was won by Obiang's PDGE. During the electoral contest, the ruling party hosted internal elections which were later scrapped as none of the president's favorite candidates led the internal lists. Ultimately, the ruling party and the satellites of the ruling coalition decided to run not based on the candidates but based on the party. This created a situation where during the election the ruling party's coalition did not provide the names of their candidates so effectively individuals were not running for office, instead, the party was the one running for office.

The May 2013 elections were marked by a series of events including the popular protest planned by a group of activists from the MPP (Movement of Popular Protest) which included several social and political groups. The MPP called for a peaceful protest at the Plaza de la Mujer square on 15 May. MPP coordinator Enrique Nsolo Nzo was arrested and official state media portrayed him as planning to destabilize the country and depose the president. However, despite speaking under duress and with clear signs of torture, Nsolo said that they had planned a peaceful protest and had indeed obtained all the legal authorizations required to carry out the peaceful protest. In addition to that, he firmly stated that he was not affiliated with any political party. The Plaza de la Mujer square in Malabo was occupied by the police from 13 May and it has been heavily guarded ever since. The government embarked on a censorship program that affected social sites including Facebook and other websites that were critical to the government of Equatorial Guinea. The censorship was implemented by redirecting online searches to the official government website.

Shortly after the elections, opposition party CPDS announced that they were going to protest peacefully against the 26 May elections on 25 June. Interior minister Clemente Engonga refused to authorise the protest on the grounds that it could "destabilize" the country and CPDS decided to go forward, claiming constitutional right. On the night of 24 June, the CPDS headquarters in Malabo were surrounded by heavily armed police officers to keep those inside from leaving and thus effectively blocking the protest. Several leading members of CPDS were detained in Malabo and others in Bata were kept from boarding several local flights to Malabo.

In 2016 Obiang was reelected for an additional seven-year term, in an election which, according to Freedom House, was plagued by police violence, detentions and torture against opposition factions.

President Obiang's Democratic Party of Equatorial Guinea holds 99 of the 100 seats in the Chamber of Deputies and all of those in the Senate. The opposition is almost non-existent in the country and is organized from Spain mainly within the social-democratic Convergence for Social Democracy. Most of the media are under state control; the private television channels, those of the Asonga group, belong to the president's family.

Armed forces 

The Armed Forces of Equatorial Guinea consists of approximately 2,500 service members. The army has almost 1,400 soldiers, the police 400 paramilitary men, the navy 200 service members, and the air force about 120 members. There is also a gendarmerie, but the number of members is unknown. The Gendarmerie is a new branch of the service in which training and education is being supported by the French Military Cooperation in Equatorial Guinea.

Geography 

Equatorial Guinea is on the west coast of Central Africa. The country consists of a mainland territory, Río Muni, which is bordered by Cameroon to the north and Gabon to the east and south, and five small islands, Bioko, Corisco, Annobón, Elobey Chico (Small Elobey), and Elobey Grande (Great Elobey). Corisco and the two Elobey islands are in Corisco Bay, on the border of Río Muni and Gabon.

Climate 

Equatorial Guinea has a tropical climate with distinct wet and dry seasons. From June to August, Río Muni is dry and Bioko wet; from December to February, the reverse occurs. In between there is gradual transition. Rain or mist occurs daily on Annobón, where a cloudless day has never been registered.

Ecology 
Equatorial Guinea spans several ecoregions. Río Muni region lies within the Atlantic Equatorial coastal forests ecoregion except for patches of Central African mangroves on the coast, especially in the Muni River estuary. The Cross-Sanaga-Bioko coastal forests ecoregion covers most of Bioko and the adjacent portions of Cameroon and Nigeria on the African mainland, and the Mount Cameroon and Bioko montane forests ecoregion covers the highlands of Bioko and nearby Mount Cameroon. The São Tomé, Príncipe, and Annobón moist lowland forests ecoregion covers all of Annobón, as well as São Tomé and Príncipe.

The country had a 2018 Forest Landscape Integrity Index mean score of 7.99/10, ranking it 30th globally out of 172 countries.

Wildlife 

Equatorial Guinea is home to gorillas, chimpanzees, various monkeys, leopards, buffalo, antelope, elephants, hippopotamuses, crocodiles, and various snakes, including pythons.

Administrative divisions 

Equatorial Guinea is divided into eight provinces. The newest province is Djibloho, created in 2017 with its headquarters at Ciudad de la Paz, the country's future capital. The eight provinces are as follows (numbers correspond to those on the map; provincial capitals appear in parentheses):

 Annobón (San Antonio de Palé)
 Bioko Norte (Malabo)
 Bioko Sur (Luba)
 Centro Sur (Evinayong)
 Djibloho (Ciudad de la Paz)
 Kié-Ntem (Ebebiyín)
 Litoral (Bata)
 Wele-Nzas (Mongomo)

The provinces are further divided into 19 districts and 37 municipalities.

Economy 

Before independence Equatorial Guinea exported cocoa, coffee and timber, mostly to its colonial ruler, Spain, but also to Germany and the UK. On 1 January 1985, the country became the first non-Francophone African member of the franc zone, adopting the CFA franc as its currency. The national currency, the ekwele, had previously been linked to the Spanish peseta.

The discovery of large oil reserves in 1996 and its subsequent exploitation contributed to a dramatic increase in government revenue. , Equatorial Guinea is the third-largest oil producer in Sub-Saharan Africa. Oil companies operating in Equatorial Guinea include ExxonMobil, Marathon Oil, Kosmos Energy and Chevron.

Forestry, farming, and fishing are also major components of GDP. Subsistence farming predominates. The deterioration of the rural economy under successive brutal regimes has diminished any potential for agriculture-led growth. Agriculture is the country's main source of employment, providing income for 57% of rural households and employment for 52% of the workforce.

In July 2004, the United States Senate published an investigation into Riggs Bank, a Washington-based bank into which most of Equatorial Guinea's oil revenues were paid until recently, and which also banked for Chile's Augusto Pinochet. The Senate report showed at least $35 million siphoned off by Obiang, his family and regime senior officials. The president has denied any wrongdoing. Riggs Bank in February 2005 paid $9 million in restitution for Pinochet's banking, no restitution was made with regard to Equatorial Guinea.

From 2000 to 2010, Equatorial Guinea had the highest average annual increase in GDP (Gross Domestic Product), 17%.

Equatorial Guinea is a member of the Organization for the Harmonization of Business Law in Africa (OHADA). Equatorial Guinea is also a member of the Central African Monetary and Economic Union (CEMAC), a subregion that comprises more than 50 million people. Equatorial Guinea tried to be validated as an Extractive Industries Transparency Initiative (EITI)–compliant country, working toward transparency in reporting of oil revenues and prudent use of natural resource wealth. The country obtained candidate status on 22 February 2008. It was then required to meet a number of obligations to do so, including committing to working with civil society and companies on EITI implementation, appointing a senior individual to lead on EITI implementation, and publishing a fully costed Work Plan with measurable targets, a timetable for implementation and an assessment of capacity constraints. However, when Equatorial Guinea applied to extend the deadline for completing EITI validation, the EITI Board did not agree to the extension.

According to the World Bank, Equatorial Guinea has the highest GNI (Gross National Income) per capita of any African country, 83 times larger than the GNI per capita of Burundi, the poorest country.

Yet despite its impressive GNI figure, Equatorial Guinea is plagued by extreme poverty brought about by Wealth Inequality. Its Gini coefficient of 65.0 is the highest in the entire world.

The economy of Equatorial Guinea was expected to grow about 2.6% in 2021, a projection based on the successful completion of a large gas project and the recovery of the world economy by the second half of the year. But the country is expected to return to recession in 2022, with a real GDP decline of about 4.4%.

According to the 2016 United Nations Human Development Report, Equatorial Guinea had a gross domestic product per capita of $21,517, one of the highest levels of wealth in Africa. However, it is one of the most unequal countries in the world according to the Gini index, with 70 percent of the population living on one dollar a day. The country ranks 145th out of 189 on the United Nations Human Development Index in 2019.

Hydrocarbons account for 97% of the state's exports and it is a member of the African Petroleum Producers Organization. in 2020, it faces its eighth year of recession, due in part to endemic corruption.

Transportation 

Due to the large oil industry in the country, internationally recognized carriers fly to Malabo International Airport which, in May 2014, had several direct connections to Europe and West Africa. There are three airports in Equatorial Guinea—Malabo International Airport, Bata Airport and the new Annobón Airport on the island of Annobón. Malabo International Airport is the only international airport.

Every airline registered in Equatorial Guinea appears on the list of air carriers prohibited in the European Union (EU) which means that they are banned from operating services of any kind within the EU. However, freight carriers provide service from European cities to the capital.

Demographics 

The majority of the people of Equatorial Guinea are of Bantu origin. The largest ethnic group, the Fang, is indigenous to the mainland, but substantial migration to Bioko Island since the 20th century means the Fang population exceeds that of the earlier Bubi inhabitants. The Fang constitute 80% of the population and comprise around 67 clans. Those in the northern part of Río Muni speak Fang-Ntumu, while those in the south speak Fang-Okah; the two dialects have differences but are mutually intelligible. Dialects of Fang are also spoken in parts of neighboring Cameroon (Bulu) and Gabon. These dialects, while still intelligible, are more distinct. The Bubi, who constitute 15% of the population, are indigenous to Bioko Island. The traditional demarcation line between Fang and 'Beach' (inland) ethnic groups was the village of Niefang (limit of the Fang), east of Bata.

Coastal ethnic groups, sometimes referred to as Ndowe or "Playeros" (Beach People in Spanish): Combes, Bujebas, Balengues, and Bengas on the mainland and small islands, and Fernandinos, a Krio community on Bioko Island together comprise 5% of the population. Europeans (largely of Spanish or Portuguese descent, some with partial African ancestry) also live in the country, but most ethnic Spaniards left after independence.

A growing number of foreigners from neighboring Cameroon, Nigeria, and Gabon have immigrated to the country. According to the Encyclopedia of the Stateless Nations (2002) 7% of Bioko islanders were Igbo, an ethnic group from southeastern Nigeria. Equatorial Guinea received Asians and native Africans from other countries as workers on cocoa and coffee plantations. Other black Africans came from Liberia, Angola, and Mozambique. Most of the Asian population is Chinese, with small numbers of Indians.

Equatorial Guinea has also been a destination for fortune-seeking European immigrants from Britain, France and Germany. Israelis and Moroccans also live and work here. Oil extraction since the 1990s has contributed to a doubling of the population in Malabo. After independence, thousands of Equatorial Guineans went to Spain. Another 100,000 Equatorial Guineans went to Cameroon, Gabon, and Nigeria because of the dictatorship of Francisco Macías Nguema. Some Equatorial Guinean communities are also found in Latin America, the United States, Portugal, and France.

Languages 

Since its independence in 1968, the main official language of Equatorial Guinea has been Spanish (the local variant is Equatoguinean Spanish), which acts as a lingua franca among its different ethnic groups. In 1970, during Macías' rule, Spanish was replaced by Fang, the language of its majority ethnic group, to which Macías belonged. That decision was reverted in 1979 after Macías' fall. Spanish remained as its lone official language until 1998, when French was added as its second one, as it had previously joined the Economic and Monetary Community of Central Africa (CEMAC), whose founding members are French-speaking nations, two of them (Cameroon and Gabon) surrounding its continental region. Portuguese was adopted as its third official language in 2010. Spanish has been an official language since 1844. It is still the language of education and administration. 67.6% of Equatorial Guineans can speak it, especially those living in the capital, Malabo. French was only made official in order to join the Francophonie and it is not locally spoken, except in some border towns.

Aboriginal languages are recognised as integral parts of the "national culture" (Constitutional Law No. 1/1998 21 January). Indigenous languages (some of them creoles) include Fang, Bube, Benga, Ndowe, Balengue, Bujeba, Bissio, Gumu, Igbo, Pichinglis, Fa d'Ambô and the nearly extinct Baseke. Most African ethnic groups speak Bantu languages.

Fa d'Ambô, a Portuguese creole, has vigorous use in Annobón Province, in Malabo (the capital), and among some speakers in Equatorial Guinea's mainland. Many residents of Bioko can also speak Spanish, particularly in the capital, and the local trade language Pichinglis, an English-based creole. Spanish is not spoken much in Annobón. In government and education Spanish is used. Noncreolized Portuguese is used as a liturgical language by local Catholics. The Annobonese ethnic community tried to gain membership in the Community of Portuguese Language Countries (CPLP). The government financed an Instituto Internacional da Língua Portuguesa (IILP) sociolinguistic study in Annobón. It documented strong links with the Portuguese creole populations in São Tomé and Príncipe, Cape Verde and Guinea-Bissau.

Due to historical and cultural ties, in 2010 the legislature amended article four of the Constitution of Equatorial Guinea, to establish Portuguese as an official language of the Republic. This was an effort by the government to improve its communications, trade, and bilateral relations with Portuguese-speaking countries. It also recognises long historical ties with Portugal, and with Portuguese-speaking peoples of Brazil, São Tomé and Príncipe, and Cape Verde.

Some of the motivations for Equatorial Guinea's pursuit of membership in the Community of Portuguese Language Countries (CPLP) included access to several professional and academic exchange programmes and facilitated cross-border circulation of citizens. The adoption of Portuguese as an official language was the primary requirement to apply for CPLP acceptance. In addition, the country was told it must adopt political reforms allowing effective democracy and respect for human rights. The national parliament discussed this law in October 2011.

In February 2012, Equatorial Guinea's foreign minister signed an agreement with the IILP on the promotion of Portuguese in the country.

In July 2012, the CPLP refused Equatorial Guinea full membership, primarily because of its continued serious violations of human rights. The government responded by legalising political parties, declaring a moratorium on the death penalty, and starting a dialog with all political factions. Additionally, the IILP secured land from the government for the construction of Portuguese language cultural centres in Bata and Malabo. At its tenth summit in Dili in July 2014, Equatorial Guinea was admitted as a CPLP member. Abolition of the death penalty and the promotion of Portuguese as an official language were preconditions of the approval.

Religion 

The principal religion in Equatorial Guinea is Christianity, the faith of 93% of the population. Roman Catholics make up the majority (88%), while a minority are Protestants (5%). 2% of the population follows Islam (mainly Sunni). The remaining 5% practise Animism, Baháʼí, and other beliefs, and traditional animist beliefs are often mixed with Catholicism.

Health 

Equatorial Guinea's innovative malaria programs in the early 21st century achieved success in reducing malaria infection, disease, and mortality. Their program consists of twice-yearly indoor residual spraying (IRS), the introduction of artemisinin combination treatment (ACTs), the use of intermittent preventive treatment in pregnant women (IPTp), and the introduction of very high coverage with long-lasting insecticide-treated mosquito nets (LLINs). Their efforts resulted in a reduction in all-cause under-five mortality from 152 to 55 deaths per 1,000 live births (down 64%), a sharp drop that coincided with the launch of the program.

In June 2014 four cases of polio were reported, the country's first outbreak of the disease.

Education 

Among sub-Saharan African countries, Equatorial Guinea has one of the highest literacy rates. According to The World Factbook - Central Intelligence Agency as of 2015, 95.3% of the population age 15 and over can read and write in Equatorial Guinea were respectively literate. Under Francisco Macias, education was neglected, and few children received any type of education. Under President Obiang, the illiteracy rate dropped from 73% to 13%, and the number of primary school students rose from 65,000 in 1986 to more than 100,000 in 1994. Education is free and compulsory for children between the ages of 6 and 14.

The Equatorial Guinea government has partnered with Hess Corporation and The Academy for Educational Development (AED) to establish a $20 million education program for primary school teachers to teach modern child development techniques. There are now 51 model schools whose active pedagogy will be a national reform.

In recent years, with change in the economic and political climate and government social agendas, several cultural dispersion and literacy organizations have been founded, chiefly with the financial support of the Spanish government. The country has one university, the Universidad Nacional de Guinea Ecuatorial (UNGE), with a campus in Malabo and a Faculty of Medicine located in Bata on the mainland. In 2009 the university produced the first 110 national doctors. The Bata Medical School is supported principally by the government of Cuba and staffed by Cuban medical educators and physicians.

Culture 

In June 1984, the First Hispanic-African Cultural Congress was convened to explore the cultural identity of Equatorial Guinea. The congress constituted the center of integration and the marriage of the Hispanic culture with African cultures.

Tourism 

Equatorial Guinea currently has no UNESCO World Heritage Site or tentative sites for the World Heritage List. The country also has no documented heritage listed in the Memory of the World Programme of UNESCO nor any intangible cultural heritage listed in the UNESCO Intangible Cultural Heritage List.

Tourist attractions are the colonial quarter in Malabo, the southern part of the island Bioko where you can hike to the Iladyi cascades and to remote beaches to watch nesting turtles, Bata with its shoreline Paseo Maritimo and the tower of liberty, Mongomo with its basilica (the second largest Catholic church in Africa) and the new planned and built capital Ciudad de la Paz.

Media and communications 

The principal means of communication within Equatorial Guinea are 3 state-operated FM radio stations. BBC World Service, Radio France Internationale and Gabon-based Africa No 1 broadcast on FM in Malabo. There is also an independent radio option called Radio Macuto, the voice of the voiceless. Radio Macuto is a web-based radio and news source known for publishing news that call out Obiang's regime and call for the mobilisation of the ecuatoguinean community to exercise freedom of speech and engage in politics. There are also five shortwave radio stations. Television Nacional, the television network, is state operated. The international TV programme RTVGE is available via satellites in Africa, Europa, and the Americas and worldwide via Internet. There are two newspapers and two magazines.

Equatorial Guinea ranks at position 161 out of 179 countries in the 2012 Reporters Without Borders press freedom index. The watchdog says the national broadcaster obeys the orders of the information ministry. Most of the media companies practice self-censorship, and are banned by law from criticising public figures. The state-owned media and the main private radio station are under the directorship of the president's son, Teodor Obiang.

Landline telephone penetration is low, with only two lines available for every 100 persons. There is one GSM mobile telephone operator, with coverage of Malabo, Bata, and several mainland cities. , approximately 40% of the population subscribed to mobile telephone services. The only telephone provider in Equatorial Guinea is Orange.

There were more than 42,000 internet users by December 2011.

Music 

There is little popular music coming out of Equatorial Guinea. Pan-African styles like soukous and makossa are popular, as are reggae and rock and roll. Acoustic guitar bands based on a Spanish model are the country's best-known indigenous popular tradition.

Cinema 
In 2014 the South African-Dutch-Equatorial Guinean drama film Where the Road Runs Out was shot in the country. There is also the documentary The Writer From a Country Without Bookstores, that has still to be internationally premiered. It focuses on one of Equatorial Guinea's most translated writers Juan Tomás Ávila Laurel. It is the first feature film openly critical of Obiang's regime.

Sports 

Equatorial Guinea was chosen to co-host the 2012 African Cup of Nations in partnership with Gabon, and hosted the 2015 edition. The country was also chosen to host the 2008 Women's African Football Championship, which they won. The women's national team qualified for the 2011 World Cup in Germany.

In June 2016, Equatorial Guinea was chosen to host the 12th African Games in 2019.

Equatorial Guinea is famous for the swimmers Eric Moussambani, nicknamed "Eric the Eel", and Paula Barila Bolopa, "Paula the Crawler", who attended the 2000 Summer Olympics.

Basketball has been increasing in popularity.

See also 

 Outline of Equatorial Guinea

Notes

References

Sources 

 
 Max Liniger-Goumaz, Small Is Not Always Beautiful: The Story of Equatorial Guinea (French 1986, translated 1989) .

 Robert Klitgaard. 1990. Tropical Gangsters. New York: Basic Books. (World Bank economist tries to assist pre-oil Equatorial Guinea) .
 D.L. Claret. Cien años de evangelización en Guinea Ecuatorial (1883–1983) / One Hundred Years of Evangelism in Equatorial Guinea (1983, Barcelona: Claretian Missionaries).
 Adam Roberts, The Wonga Coup: Guns, Thugs and a Ruthless Determination to Create Mayhem in an Oil-Rich Corner of Africa (2006, PublicAffairs) .

External links 

 
 
 Official Government of Equatorial Guinea website
 Guinea in Figures – Official Web Page of the Government of the Republic of Equatorial Guinea 
 Country Profile from BBC News.
 Equatorial Guinea. The World Factbook. Central Intelligence Agency.
 Equatorial Guinea from UCB Libraries GovPubs.

 
Central African countries
Former Portuguese colonies
Former Spanish colonies
French-speaking countries and territories
Member states of OPEC
Member states of the Organisation internationale de la Francophonie
Member states of the African Union
Member states of the United Nations
Republics
Spanish-speaking countries and territories
States and territories established in 1968
Member states of the Community of Portuguese Language Countries
1968 establishments in Africa
Portuguese-speaking countries and territories
Countries in Africa
Former least developed countries